In Norse cosmology, Niðavellir (anglic. as Nidavellir; probable compound of O.N. Nið - "new moon", "the wane of the moon" (perhaps related to niðr - "down") + Vellir (pl. of völlr) - "fields": Dark Fields, Downward Fields), also called Myrkheim (Myrkheimr, O.N. compd. of myrkr - "darkness" + heimr - "home": the world of darkness, Dark Abode), is the home of the Dwarves.

Völuspá
It is mentioned in the Völuspá:

Stóð fyr norðan, / á Niðavöllom / salr úr gulli / Sindra ættar

(Stood to the north, a dark field, Halls of gold, Sindri's Clan,").

One interpretation of the above verse would read like this:

Before you reach the north (Niflheim being the world furthest to the north), A dark dwelling stands (The dwarf world), In halls of gold, Sindri's bloodline lives.

Sindri was a famous dwarf. And ættar means bloodline, or in this case most likely kin or tribe.

Niðavellir has often been interpreted as one of the Nine Worlds of Norse legend. The problem is that both Niðavellir and Svartalfheim are mentioned, and it is unclear if the sixth world is a world of dwarfs or one of black elves.

The dwarfs' world is mentioned in the Prose Edda by Snorri Sturluson as Svartálfaheimr.

See also
Eitri

References

Other sources
Faulkes, Anthony (trans. and ed.) (1987) Edda of Snorri Sturluson (Everyman's Library) 
Lindow, John (2001) Handbook of Norse mythology (Santa Barbara: ABC-Clio) 
Orchard, Andy (1997) Dictionary of Norse Myth and Legend (Cassell) 
Simek, Rudolf (2007) translated by Angela Hall. Dictionary of Northern Mythology  (D.S. Brewer)

External links
The Poetic Edda   (1923) Henry Adams Bellows, translator  (New York: The American-Scandinavian Foundation)

Locations in Norse mythology